Efrén Tiburcio Márquez (February 22, 1973 – December 23, 2019), known under the ring name Mr. Niebla, was a Mexican luchador enmascarado (Spanish for masked professional wrestler) who worked for Consejo Mundial de Lucha Libre (CMLL). "Niebla" is Spanish for "fog". His in-ring style focused more on comedy, which often included pratfalls (a form of physical comedy based on falling on the buttocks), dancing and mocking his opponents during matches.

Mr. Niebla worked for CMLL from the early 1990s until 2007, and again from 2008 until his death in 2019. In between, he worked for CMLL's main Mexican rival, AAA, where he was part of the stable Los Vipers. In 2008 he, and Negro Casas created the group known as La Peste Negra (Spanish for "the Black Plague") that also includes El Felino and Bárbaro Cavernario.

Mr. Niebla, Felino and Casas held the Mexican National Trios Championship from 2014 to 2015, and Mr. Niebla won the CMLL World Heavyweight Championship. He was also part of teams that won the CMLL World Tag Team Championship and the CMLL World Trios Championship. Over the years, he won the Gran Alternativa, Torneo Nacional de Parejas Increíbles, and Leyenda de Azul tournaments.

Professional wrestling career
Efrén Tiburcio Márquez made his professional wrestling debut on November 11, 1990, working under the Ring name Chamaco Audaz (the Audacious Kid). Later he would work under various ring names and mask as El Pupilo (the Pupil), El Marquez, Shadow 2000, Chico Veloz (Fast Boy) and even "Batman" for a brief period. In March 1992 he finally came up with the name "Mr. Niebla", which he used since then. Working as Mr. Niebla, he would earn the nickname El Caballero del Estilo Diferente (the Gentleman of the different style).

Consejo Mundial de Lucha Libre (1995–2007)
In the early 1990s, Mr. Niebla began working for Mexico's largest professional wrestling promotion Consejo Mundial de Lucha Libre (CMLL). Early on Mr. Niebla worked mainly for one of the local CMLL-affiliates but did manage to win both the Distrito Federal Welterweight Championship and the Distrito Federal Tag Team Championship once. By the mid-1990s Mr. Niebla worked full-time for the main roster, taking part in the 1996 CMLL Torneo Gran Alternativa. Mr. Niebla was teamed with Héctor Garza and qualified for the finals but ultimately lost to Emilio Charles Jr. and Rey Bucanero. In 1997 Mr. Niebla formed a trio with fellow good guys (called Técnicos in Lucha Libre) Lizmark and Atlantis called La Ola Azul (the Blue Wave). On April 29, 1997, La Ola Azul defeated El Satánico, Emilio Charles Jr. and Rey Bucanero to win the CMLL World Trios Championship, Mr. Niebla's first major title victory. Over the next year the team would successfully defend the title twice against the team of Apolo Dantés, Kevin Quinn and Steel and once against the previous champions. On January 23, 1998, Mr. Niebla teamed up with Shocker to win the CMLL World Tag Team Championship from Dr. Wagner Jr. and Emilio Charles Jr. Subsequently, Niebla and Shocker would defend the tag team championship against Blue Panther and Black Warrior, Bestia Salvaje and Scorpio Jr. and the Hermanos Dinamita (Cien Caras and Universo 2000). In October 1998 Mr. Niebla suffered a severe injury during a match, forcing him to vacate both the Trios and the Tag Team championships.

In early 1998 a wrestler in International Wrestling Revolution Group (IWRG) began working as "Mr. Niebla", adopting the same style mask and trunks as the original Mr. Niebla. IWRG stated that the original Mr. Niebla did not hold the naming rights and a trainer gave him the name with the promotion obtaining permission from the trainer. When the original Mr. Niebla was injured CMLL brought in the second Mr. Niebla and had him work matches while the original was injured. When the original Mr. Niebla returned to the ring he immediately attacked the impostor. The storyline between the two Mr. Nieblas ended when the two met in a Luchas de apuestas, mask vs. mask match for the rights to the name. The original Mr. Niebla won, forcing the impostor to unmask and change his name to Mr. Mexico. Mr. Niebla continued to team with Shocker; the team were unable to reclaim the tag team title. On September 24, 1999, at the CMLL 66th Anniversary Show, the team of Nr. Niebla and Shocker faced Atlantis and Villano III in a Relevos suicida match, a match where the losing team would fight each other for their mask. In the primary match of CMLL's 66th Anniversary show, Atlantis and Villano III defeated the much less experienced team, afterward Mr. Niebla defeated Shocker to unmask him.

On March 30, 2001, Mr. Niebla teamed up with Olímpico and Safari to defeat Blue Panther, Fuerza Guerrera and El Signo to win the Mexican National Trios Championship. For the next 450 days the trios defended the title against Emilio Charles Jr., Bestia Salvaje and Scorpio Jr.; Satánico, Averno and Black Warrior; Los Boricuas (Gran Markus Jr., Poder Boricua and Violencia) and Los Infernales (Satanico, Averno, Mephisto). Their second defense against Los Infernales was unsuccessful and on June 23, 2002, Mr. Niebla, Olímpico and Safair lost the Mexican National Trios Title. One week prior, on June 16, Mr. Niebla had teamed up with Atlantis and Black Warrior to regain the CMLL World Trios Title from Dr. Wagner Jr. Blue Panther and Fuerza Guerrera. The team defended the titles into 2003, losing them to Dr. Wagner Jr., Universo 2000 and Black Tiger III on March 31, 2003. The match against Wagner, Universo and Black Tiger III was part of a longer storyline between Mr. Niebla and Universo 2000. The two had clashed in 2002 over Universo 2000's CMLL World Heavyweight Championship but at the time Universo 2000 had kept the title.

On April 18, 2003, Mr. Niebla defeated Universo 2000 to become the CMLL World Heavyweight Champion. Mr. Niebla would successfully turn back the challenges of Universo 2000, Apolo Dantés, Shocker, Rey Bucanero and Tinieblas Jr. over the next 543 days. On October 12, 2004, Mr. Niebla lost the CMLL World Heavyweight Championship back to Universo 2000 and was unsuccessful in his attempt to regain it. Around late 2006 to early 2007, Mr. Niebla left CMLL, he would later explain the decision to leave as a desire for him not to "go backward" down the rankings of the promotion, stating that he felt he would get better opportunities elsewhere.

Asistencia Asesoría y Administración (2007–2008)

After working for CMLL for over a decade, Mr. Niebla left CMLL to work for their main rival Asistencia Asesoría y Administración (AAA) in later 2007. Niebla made his debut as one of Los Vipers, a long-existing faction of villains (known as Rudos in Lucha Libre), and soon began challenging Los Vipers' leader Abismo Negro for the leadership role. In early 2008 the storyline saw the two physically fight over the leadership in matches where the job was on the line. Each time Abismo Negro won, AAA head booker Joaquín Roldan announced that the decision and Negro, the winner, did not lead Los Vipers. After the second match the rest of Los Vipers turned on Abismo Negro and ejected him from the group. The storyline was supposed to end in a Luchas de apuestas match between Niebla and Negro at Triplemanía XVI. Later on, the match was changed to a multi-man steel cage match including all of Los Vipers (Mr. Niebla, Black Abyss, Psicosis II and Histeria) and Abismo Negro with the last person in the cage being forced to unmask. A few days before the match, it was cancelled, as AAA announced that Abismo Negro had sustained a neck injury. On the night of Triplemanía XVI Mr. Niebla quit AAA, opting to return to CMLL instead. Mr. Niebla subsequently stated he left AAA, because a major mask vs. mask match he was promised fell through when Abismo Negro was unable to work the Triplemanía match and that he came back to CMLL looking to make his mark unmasking a "big name" such as Místico or Dr. Wagner Jr. He also apologized to AAA if they were unhappy with the method he used, but he believed he handled everything in a professional manner and that he was upfront about his ambitions for a "big name" mask-versus-mask match.

Return to CMLL (2008–2019)

When Mr. Niebla returned to CMLL in July 2008, he quickly formed a group with Negro Casas and Heavy Metal called La Peste Negra (Spanish for "the Black Plague), a Rudo group that had a more comical approach to wrestling. The trio started wearing large afro wigs, painting their faces black and dancing during their entrances and generally worked a less serious style of match than usual, especially for a serious wrestler like Negro Casas. On September 2, 2008, the last Casas brother, El Felino turned Rudo as well and joined La Peste Negra. After Felino joined the group Heavy Metal was quietly phased out, as he was not comfortable working the comedic style. Felino's wife Princesa Blanca joined the group in early 2009, turning Rudo to work with La Peste, this led to Princesa Blanca winning the Mexican National Women's Championship from Marcela on January 30, 2009. La Peste Negra's biggest triumph to date is Negro Casas' title win over Místico, earning the group the CMLL World Welterweight Championship . Mr. Niebla did not work any matches for three months, starting in March 2010. In early June 2010, CMLL announced that after recuperating in Europe Mr. Niebla was ready to return to the ring, reuniniting La Peste Negra for the first time in several months.

After making only a few in-ring appearances, Mr. Niebla disappeared from the CMLL booking sheets once again, replaced with Rey Bucanero. It was later revealed that his body had rejected the implant he had been given during his previous time away from the ring and it had to be replaced, putting him out of action for approximately a month before he was able to wrestle again. On August 16, 2010, it was announced that the recently returned Mr. Niebla would be one of 14 men putting their mask on the line in a Luchas de Apuestas steel cage match, the main event of the CMLL 77th Anniversary Show. Mr. Niebla was the sixth man to leave the steel cage, keeping his mask safe. The match came down to La Sombra pinning Olímpico to unmask him. On July 29, 2011, Mr. Niebla defeated 15 other men to win the 2011 Leyenda de Azul.

At the 2012 Homenaje a Dos Leyendas, Mr. Niebla and Atlantis defeated Rush and El Terrible to win the Torneo Nacional de Parejas Increíbles tournament, where rivals teamed together. In late 2012 the long-dormant rivalry between Mr. Niebla and his former tag team partner Shocker was resumed as the two began to work on opposite sides of a number of matches, with increasing intensity and animosity from both wrestlers. The two were paired up for the 2013 Torneo Nacional de Parejas Increíbles as a way to continue the storyline between the two. The team worked together without too many problems in the initial rounds as they defeated the team of Marco Corleone and Kraneo and then Máscara Dorada and Mephisto to qualify for the semi-finals. In the semi-finals they lost to eventual tournament winners La Sombra and Volador Jr. Following the loss Mr. Niebla and Shocker argued and almost came to blows over who was responsible for losing the match.

In January 2014, Niebla introduced new Peste Negra members Bárbaro Cavernario and Herodes Jr. On February 14, Niebla and Cavernario defeated Soberano Jr. and Volador Jr. in the finals to win the 2014 Torneo Gran Alternativa. On February 18, Niebla, El Felino and Negro Casas defeated La Máscara, Rush and Titán to win the Mexican National Trios Championship. In January 2015, Niebla made his New Japan Pro-Wrestling (NJPW) debut, when he worked the Fantastica Mania 2015 tour, co-produced by CMLL and NJPW. Mr. Niebla did not wrestle on the last two stops of the tour. According to the Wrestling Observer Newsletter, Niebla had disappeared on the third night, and was found passed out in his hotel room the following morning, after which he was rushed to a local hospital for the next three days. NJPW, reportedly furious at the event, made CMLL pay for the hospital bill, leading the promotion to fire Niebla after his return to Mexico. CMLL confirmed Niebla's departure from the promotion in February 2015.

Folliwng the Fantasica Mania incident Mr. Niebla would continue to wrestle, working for various independent promotions. Niebla returned to CMLL on April 5, 2015, after his suspension, teaming with El Felino and Negro Casas in a six-man tag team match, where they defeated Máximo, Titán and Volador Jr. On April 26, La Peste Negra lost the Mexican National Trios Championship to Los Reyes de la Atlantida (Atlantis, Delta and Guerrero Maya Jr.).

La Peste Negra participated in the CMLL 82nd Anniversary Show, losing to Dragon Lee, Místico and Valiente on the fourth match of the show. Mr. Niebla was paired up with rookie Warrior Steel for the 2016 Gran Alternativa tournament, losing in the first round to Rush and Golden Magic. In the first half of 2016 Mr. Niebla was programmed with Volador Jr. in a feud, which included he two teaming up for the 2016 Torneo Nacional de Parejas Increíbles tournament. The two defeated Blue Panther and Ephesto in the first round, Bobby Z and Máscara Dorada in the second round, before they to Mephisto and Místico in the semi-finals as Mr. Nebla and Volador Jr. were not able to get along long enough to win the match.

When the CMLL World Heavyweight Championship was vacated in mid-2017 Mr. Niebla was given an opportunity to become a two-time champion as he entered a torneo cibernetico elimination match, He was eliminated by eventual winner Marco Corleone. In early 2018 CMLL revisited the previously aborted storyline between Mr. Niebla and Atlantis as they teamed up for the 2018 Parejas Increíbles tournament. The duo defeated Ángel de Oro and El Cuatrero in the first round, but were defeated by Rush and El Terrible in the second round.

Mr Niebla was suspended by CMLL after working a match in August he was clearly not in any condition to wrestle in. He would not return to CMLL for six months, making his return on March 12, 2019.

Personal life
Efrén Tiburcio Márquez was born on February 22, 1973, the son of Paulino Tiburcio. He would later marry Mariela Rodríguez and together the couple have a son and a daughter. At one point his son was training for a professional wrestling career, but did not complete his training at the time.

Mr. Niebla publicly acknowledged that he was an alcoholic, stating in a 2018 interview that his drinking problem had cost him a lot over the years in regards to his career and prosperity. In the same interview he claimed that he was not a "drunken fighter" notwithstanding his alcoholism.

Notwithstanding Mr. Niebla's claims, there were incidents over the years where he was wrestling despite being in no condition to perform. During the 2015 Fantastica Mania tour of Japan, Mr. Niebla was taken off the shows and later had to be hospitalized during the tour. Afterward, CMLL fired him. He was later rehired by CMLL. On August 28, 2018, Mr. Niebla worked a Tuesday night show for CMLL where he was visibly impaired as he fell off the ropes during his entrance. He was not involved in the first fall, while a visibly upset Volador Jr. removed Mr. Niebla's mask at the beginning of the second fall to draw a disqualification. Volador Jr. left the ring before the announcement was made. Mr. Niebla subsequently stated he was injured and the swift conclusion was to shield those in the ring from further problems. After the incident CMLL announced that Mr. Niebla had been removed from the CMLL 85th Anniversary Show, followed by the Mexico City wrestling commission announcing that they had indefinitely suspended his wrestling license. Prior to his CMLL return in 2019, CMLL officials informed him that he would be fired if he worked drunk again.

Death and legacy 
Mr. Niebla died from complications of a septic arthritis on December 23, 2019. Prior to his death, CMLL had announced that they were holding a benefit show for Mr. Niebla on January 4 to help pay for his latest medical expenses, but with Mr. Niebla's death it became a tribute show, El Ultimo Vuelo del Rey del Guaguanco ("The last flight of the King of Guaguanco"), with the money collected going to his family. As part of the show, Drone won the Copa Mr. Niebla trophy. As part the tribute, Micro-Estrella Zacarias, who often accompanied Mr. Niebla to the ring, worked as a small version of Mr. Niebla instead of his normal mask and outfit. CMLL also announced that they were holding a special show, La Noche de Mr. Niebla, on January 24.

Name confusion 
Over the years at least four different wrestlers have used the ring name "Mr. Niebla":
Guadalupe Tovar Hernández (1938–2014) — the first wrestler to use the name
José Guadalupe Gutiérrez Álvarez (1949–2017) — wrestled as "Mr. Niebla" from 1978 to 1994
Efrén Tiburcio Márquez (1973–2019) — wrestled as "Mr. Niebla" from 1992 to 2019
Miguel Ángel Guzmán Velázquez (b. 1970) — wrestled as "Mr. Niebla" from 1998 to 1999

Championships and accomplishments 
Consejo Mundial de Lucha Libre
CMLL World Heavyweight Championship (1 time)
CMLL World Tag Team Championship (1 time) – with Shocker
CMLL World Trios Championship (2 times) – with Atlantis and Lizmark, Atlantis and Black Warrior
Carnaval Increible Tournament (2000) – with Último Guerrero and Rey Bucanero
CMLL Torneo Gran Alternativa (2014) – with Bárbaro Cavernario
CMLL Torneo Nacional de Parejas Increíbles (2012) – with Atlantis
Salvador Lutteroth Singles Tournament (1998)
Mexican National Trios Championship (2 times) – with Safari and Olímpico (1), and El Felino and Negro Casas (1)
Distrito Federal Welterweight Championship (1 time)
Distrito Federal Tag Team Championship (1 time) – unknown partner
Leyenda de Azul (2011)
International Wrestling Revolution Group
Copa Higher Power (1998) – with El Pantera, Shocker, El Solar, Star Boy, and Mike Segura
Pro Wrestling Illustrated
PWI ranked him #208 of the top 500 singles wrestlers in the PWI 500 in 2010
Other promotions
WFS Tag Team Championship (1 time) – with Vertigo

Luchas de Apuestas record

Notes

References

External links
Cagematch.net

1973 births
Masked wrestlers
Mexican male professional wrestlers
Professional wrestlers from Mexico City
Unidentified wrestlers
2019 deaths
20th-century professional wrestlers
21st-century professional wrestlers
Mexican National Trios Champions
CMLL World Heavyweight Champions
CMLL World Tag Team Champions
CMLL World Trios Champions